The name Jennifer has been used for three tropical cyclones in the Eastern Pacific Ocean.

 Tropical Storm Jennifer-Katherine (1963)
 Hurricane Jennifer (1969)
 Tropical Storm Jennifer (1973)

See also
 Tropical Storm Jenny, a name currently used in the Philippine Area of Responsibility in the Western Pacific.

Pacific hurricane set index articles